Jean (Jehan) Rolin (1408–1483) was a French bishop and Cardinal.

His father, Nicolas Rolin, was ducal Chancellor of Burgundy, and lord of Authumes. Jean became a Cardinal in 1448, created by Pope Nicholas V, as part of diplomatic engagement between the Duchy of Burgundy and the Papacy, tending against France.

He was bishop of Chalon-sur-Saône in 1431, and bishop of Autun in 1436. He was a patron of the arts, supporting the work of an anonymous illustrator known as the Master of Jean Rolin.

See also

Notes

External links
Biography
 Rolin family timeline

1408 births
1483 deaths
Duchy of Burgundy
15th-century French cardinals
Bishops of Autun
Bishops of Chalon-sur-Saône